Pixton may refer to:

Howard Pixton, an early British aviator;
Aaron Pixton, an American mathematician at Princeton University;
Pixton Park, a country house in the parish of Dulverton, Somerset, England.